Cinema is the fourth solo album by Elaine Paige, released in 1984 on Warner Music. It peaked at number 12 in the UK Albums Chart.

Background 
For her previous album Stages (1983), Paige had chosen tracks from musical theatre. Following this theme, Cinema features songs that had been previously recorded for film soundtracks.

Tim Rice wrote lyrics to Vangelis's theme for the film Missing specifically for this album.

Production 
Cinema was the second of Paige's recordings to be produced by Tony Visconti.

Like Stages, the recording was primarily conducted at Visconti's Good Earth Studios, other than for "Sometimes" (Theme from Champions) which had been previously recorded at CTS Studios in London, featuring the New World Philharmonia.

Out-takes
In 2014, Rhino UK released the compilation album Elaine Paige: The Ultimate Collection which includes the out-take "What a Feeling" (from the film Flashdance), originally recorded as part of the Cinema album sessions.

Track listing
 "The Windmills of Your Mind" - 3.15 (Michel Legrand, Alan Bergman, Marilyn Bergman) - from the film The Thomas Crown Affair
 "Out Here On My Own" - 3.50 (Lesley Gore, Michael Gore) - from the film Fame
 "Prisoner (Love Theme from 'The Eyes of Laura Mars')" - 4.30 (Karen Lawrence, John Desautels) - from the film The Eyes of Laura Mars
 "Sometimes" - 2.34 (Norman Newell, Carl Davis) - from the film Champions
 "Theme from Mahogany (Do You Know Where You're Going To)" - 3.40 (Michael Masser, Gerry Goffin) - from the film Mahogany
 "Up Where We Belong" - 4.18 (Will Jennings, Buffy Sainte-Marie, Jack Nitzsche) - from the film An Officer and a Gentleman
 "Unchained Melody" - 3.43 (Hy Zaret, Alex North) - from the film Unchained
 "Bright Eyes" - 3.50 (Mike Batt) - from the film Watership Down
 "Alfie" - 2.51 (Hal David, Burt Bacharach) - from the film Alfie
 "Missing" - 3.55 (Vangelis, Tim Rice) - from the film Missing
 "The Way We Were" - 4.10 (Edward Kleban, Marvin Hamlisch) - from the film The Way We Were
 "The Rose" - 3.45 (Amanda McBroom) - from the film The Rose

Personnel

Musicians 
 Elaine Paige – vocals
 Ian Bairnson – slide guitar
 Derek Bramble – bass guitar
 Vicki Brown – backing vocals
 Simon Chamberlain – piano
 Phil Cranham – bass guitar
 Mitch Dalton – guitars
 Andy Duncan – drums
 Herbie Flowers – bass
 Sue Glove – backing vocals
 Luis Jardim – percussion
 Sunny Leslie – backing vocals
 Barry Morgan – drums
 Robin Smith – keyboards, piano, backing vocals
 Tony Visconti – guitar, backing vocals
 Graham Ward – drums
 Ray Warleigh – saxophone

Production
 Producer and mixer – Tony Visconti
 Assistant engineers – Sven Taits and Rob Trillo
 "Sometimes" engineer – David Hunt
 "Sometimes" assistant engineer – Tim Pennington
 Rhythm and string arrangements – Robin Smith
 Woodwind and orchestral arrangements – Tony Visconti
 "Sometimes" orchestral leader – David Katz

Charts

Certifications and sales

References

1984 albums
Elaine Paige albums
Albums produced by Tony Visconti
Warner Records albums